Argos Corner (also referred to as Argo Corners) is an unincorporated community in Sussex County, Delaware, United States.

Argos Corner is located along Delaware Route 1 (DE 1) southeast of Milford. It is a neighborhood consisting of one main road (Argos Corner Road), which used to be old DE 14. Argos Corner Road is perpendicular to Slaughter Beach Road.

There are two businesses on Argos Corner Road: Taylor Marine Center (a boating store and repair center), and War Relics (a store specializing in the sale of military relics and paraphernalia). Former Delaware Governor Ruth Ann Minner once lived in Argos Corner.

History
Argo's population was 31 in 1900.

References

Unincorporated communities in Sussex County, Delaware
Unincorporated communities in Delaware